Diva Junction railway station is a junction between Mumbra and Kopar that is situated in Maharashtra state, in India. It was opened in 1877.

This is a major junction in the Central Railway of Mumbai. One end of the Asia's one time third largest Parsik tunnel (1.3 km) built during the British Rule (1916) in India ends at Diva. The east part of Diva station is Sabe and west is Diva. It provides access to north, Western Railway and towards ,  and further towards Konkan Railway and south, and also to Alibaug and JNPT, via Vasai Road–Roha line.

From 18 December 2016 fast local trains halt at Diva. Few passenger trains towards Konkan Railway also halt at Diva Junction.

References

Mumbai CR railway division
Mumbai Suburban Railway stations
Railway junction stations in Maharashtra
Transport in Thane
Railway stations in Thane district
Diva-Panvel rail line